Magical Elements is Dry Jack's debut album, released in July 1979 by Inner City Records. It was recorded in October 1978 at RPM Studios in New York City. Magical Elements was reissued on CD in 2008.

Track listing 

All songs written and composed by Chuck Lamb, except "Earth Daze" by Chuck Lamb and Rod Fleeman.

 Americana Hoedown – 4:32
 Lit Spinners – 3:15
 Laurel's Dream – 6:40
 Magical Elements – 6:30
 Sunday Boogie-Nookie Stomp – 6:40
 Strollin' On Jupiter – 5:15
 Earth Daze – 9:16

Band Members 
 Chuck Lamb – piano, keyboard
 Rich Lamb – bass
 Rod Fleeman – guitar
 Jon Margolis – drums, percussion

Production 
 Aimee Chiariello and Dry Jack: Co-producers
 Mike Barbiero: Engineering
 Mark Friedman, Ed Small: Assistant engineers
 Bob Ludwig: Mastering

References

External links

1979 debut albums
Inner City Records albums